Leopoldo Ruiz y Flóres  (13 November 1865 – 12 December 1941) was a Mexican prelate of the Catholic Church who served as Archbishop of Morelia from 1911 until his death in 1941. He was previously Bishop of Léon from 1900 to 1907 and Archbishop of Linares o Nueva León from 1907 to 1911. During the Church-state negotiations following the Cristero War, he represented the Holy See as its Apostolic Delegate to Mexico. He was sent into exile in 1932 in reprisal for a sharp critique of the Mexican government by Pope Pius XI and returned in 1938.

Biography
Leopoldo Ruiz y Flóres was born on 13 November 1865 in Amealco, Mexico. He was ordained a priest on 17 March 1888.

On 12 November 1900, Pope Leo XIII appointed him Bishop of Léon. He received his episcopal consecration on 27 December 1900. On 14 September 1907, Pope  named him Archbishop of Linares o Nueva León.

On 27 November 1911, Pope Pius X named him Archbishop of Michoacán. (The name of that archdiocese changed to the Archdiocese of Morelia on 22 November 1924.)

He was appointed Apostolic Delegate to Mexico on 10 October 1929 by Pope Pius XI. The Cristero War, a rebellion against the government's suppression of the Catholic Church, was ending, but years of conflict about its resolution followed. In his new role, Ruiz led the Mexican bishops into alignment with Pope Pius, who opposed the rebellion but struggled with the government's ongoing anti-clericalism. Ruiz represented the Church in difficult negotiations with the government while contending with instructions and pronouncements from Rome. The situation worsened when Pope Pius issued an encyclical, Acerba animi, on 29 September 1932 that denounced the government for reneging on earlier agreements. Ruiz had always been a moderate in tone and posture, but as the Vatican's representative became the target of the government's response. On 3 October 1932, the Chamber of Deputies voted him into exile. He based himself nearby in San Antonio, Texas. Under pressure from Rome he resigned as Apostolic Delegate and then returned to Mexico in 1938.

He was still Archbishop of Morelia when he died on 12 December 1941 at the age of 76.

Notes

References

External links 
Catholic Hierarchy: Archbishop Leopoldo Ruiz y Flóres  

1865 births
1941 deaths
People from Amealco de Bonfil
Apostolic Nuncios to Mexico
Roman Catholic archbishops of Morelia